Barbara Cabrita (born 9 May 1982) is a French-Portuguese actress, born in Trappes in the department of Yvelines.

Early life 
Barbara was born to Portuguese immigrant parents. She began as a model at 16 years old. At 20 years old she plays in the sitcom Le Groupe and she became well known with the television series R.I.S, police scientifique, aired on first French TV channel, TF1.

Filmography

Television
Le Groupe (série télévisée) (2001–2002)
Central Nuit (2002)
Sous le soleil (2002)
Même âge, même adresse (2003–2004)
R.I.S, police scientifique (2005–2011)
Fortunes (2009–2010)

Film
Les Amateurs of Martin Valente (2003)
Just Inès (2010)
The Gilded Cage (2013)

Short film
Quelqu'un de bien (2002)
El Derechazo (2004)
C ke du bonheur (2005)
La Rivière (2005)

Commercials
Go Clear (2002)
Fanta (2003)
Les Pages jaunes (2003)
Nivéa (2003)
Bouygues Telecom (2003)

TV movie
L’Homme qui voulait passer à la télé (2005)
Déjà vu (2006)
Le Temps du silence (2011)

Music video
Patrick Bruel – Mon amant de Saint Jean (2002)
Patrick Bruel/Francis Cabrel – La Complainte de la butte (2002)
Martin Rappeneau – Julien (2006)
Tandem – La Trilogie (2006)

References

External links
 
 Barbara Cabrita's agent website

1982 births
Portuguese film actresses
French film actresses
Portuguese television actresses
French television actresses
Living people
People from Trappes
French people of Portuguese descent
21st-century Portuguese actresses
21st-century French actresses